Hysterophora is a genus of moths belonging to the family Tortricidae.

Species
Hysterophora maculosana (Haworth, [1811])

See also
List of Tortricidae genera

References

 , 1944, Dt. ent. Z. Iris 57: 67
 ,2005 World Catalogue of Insects, 6
 , 2011: Diagnoses and remarks on genera of Tortricidae, 2: Cochylini (Lepidoptera: Tortricidae). Shilap Revista de Lepidopterologia 39 (156): 397–414.

External links

tortricidae.com

Cochylini
Tortricidae genera